Armen Vardani Sarkissian (also written as Sarksyan and Sargsyan) (born 23 June 1952) is an Armenian politician, physicist and computer scientist who served as the 4th president of Armenia from 9 April 2018 to 1 February 2022. He served as Prime Minister of Armenia from 4 November 1996 to 20 March 1997 and was the country's longest-serving ambassador to the United Kingdom from 1998 to 2018. Sarkissian was elected on 2 March 2018 and assumed the presidency on 9 April 2018. He resigned on 23 January 2022. Sarkissian gave a reason for his resignation saying that the country’s constitution does not give the president sufficient powers to influence events.

Early career and education
Sarkissian graduated from the Yerevan State University Department of Theoretical Physics and Mathematics. He was a member of the National Academy of Sciences of Armenia and the National Competitiveness Council of Armenia. From 1976 to 1984, he was assistant then associate professor of Physics at Yerevan State University. In 1982, he became a visiting research fellow and eventually a professor at the University of Cambridge. 

In 1988, he established and subsequently became the Head of the Department of Computer Modeling of Complex Physical Phenomena at the same university's Department of Theoretical Physics. Sarkissian was one of the co-creators of the 1991 Tetris spinoff game Wordtris.

Political and diplomatic career

In October 1991, Sarkissian established the Armenian Embassy in London, the first Armenian diplomatic mission in the West. In addition to his diplomatic mission in the UK, he went on to become Senior Ambassador of Armenia to the European Union, to Belgium and the Netherlands, Luxembourg and the Vatican. In 1995–96, he was the Head of Mission of Armenia to the European Union.

Sarkissian was appointed Prime Minister of Armenia by President Levon Ter-Petrosyan in November 1996, serving for 4 months until resigning on 20 March 1997, being succeeded by Robert Kocharyan. The official reason for his resignation states that he resigned due to the need to get treatment for a serious illness, however there is some speculation that a dispute with Defense Minister Vazgen Sargsyan was the real reason for Sarkissian's resignation. 

After serving as Armenian Prime Minister between 1996 and 1997, he was appointed as Special Advisor to the President of the European Bank for Reconstruction and Development (EBRD) and as a Governor of EBRD from 1998 to 2000.

Armen Sarkissian was also one of the directors of Eurasia House, and Vice Chairman of the EastWest Institute. He held honorary and executive positions, including as a Member of Dean's Advisory Board at Harvard Kennedy School, Dean's Advisory Board at Harris School of Public Policy Studies at University of Chicago, Board member of International Research & Exchanges Board (IREX), the International Economic Alliance and Global Leadership Foundation. He was an Honorary Senior Research Fellow at the School of Mathematical Sciences at Queen Mary and Westfield College (now Queen Mary University of London).

He was a Member of the Global Leadership Foundation, an organization which works to support democratic leadership, prevent and resolve conflict through mediation and promote good governance in the form of democratic institutions, open markets, human rights and the rule of law.

Since 2013, he has served on the board of trustees of the International School in Dilijan. In January 2018, he received Armenian President Serzh Sargsyan's offer to be the ruling Republican Party's nominee in the country's first presidential election since the 2015 constitutional reforms.

President of Armenia

Election 
President Serzh Sargsyan on 19 January 2018 recommended the candidacy of Sarkissian for President to be supported by the ruling Republican Party during the 2018 Armenian presidential election. He also enjoyed additional support from the Armenian Revolutionary Federation bloc as well as from the Tsarukian Parliamentary bloc.

He was elected president by a majority of the National Assembly on 2 March 2018 with 90 votes in a 105-member House. Sarkissian was the only candidate in the election.

Inauguration 
Sarkissian was inaugurated on 9 April 2018. The inauguration ceremony took place at the Karen Demirchyan Complex in Yerevan. After the ceremony, he visited the Yerablur military pantheon, and laid a wreath at the monument with Defense Minister Vigen Sargsyan.

Presidency 

On inauguration day, the government led by Karen Karapetyan resigned and parties in the National Assembly had a week to put forward their proposals for prime minister. Former president Serzh Sargsyan was unanimously nominated by the members of ruling parties in the National Assembly on 16 April, and was confirmed as prime minister on 17 April. However, Sarkissian's election as prime minister was met by large-scale protests, and he resigned six days after taking the office. Karapetyan was subsequently appointed to serve as acting prime minister. On 8 May 2018, Nikol Pashinyan was elected prime minister by the National Assembly in a 59–42 vote.

Sarkissian visited Tbilisi on 26 May 2018 in his first official foreign visit to participate in the centennial celebrations of the founding of the Democratic Republic of Georgia. During his visit, he held talks with his Georgian counterpart Giorgi Margvelashvili as well as held meetings with Bidzina Ivanishvili and Sauli Niinistö.

In June 2018, Sarkissian proposed changes to the constitution to balance the President's power with the Prime Minister's power. On the eve of the centennial anniversary of the end to First World War, Sarkissian told the Schweizer Radio und Fernsehen in an interview said that he would say the following to Turkish President Recep Tayyip Erdoğan in regards to the Armenian genocide:

While visiting the Kazakhstani city of Almaty in May 2019, he said that his country could become an "international financial center" and can become a "cooperation bridge between Eurasia and EU". He said his remarks at the 15th annual Eurasian Media Forum, of which he is a co-founder.

A 2022 investigation by the Organized Crime and Corruption Reporting Project found that Sarkissian had obtained a St. Kitts and Nevis passport at 2014 at the latest. Shortly after the OCCRP sent a letter to Sarkissian, he resigned as President and the Armenian National Security Services started an investigation in Sarkissian. Under Armenian law, a president is not allowed to hold dual citizenship. According to Sarkissian, he was given the passport after investing $500,000 in a luxury hotel in St. Kitts and Nevis. He said he had requested in 2013 to return and renunciate the passport.

Role after the Karabakh conflict
In the early stages of the 2020 Nagorno-Karabakh conflict, Sarkissian gave numerous interviews to international news organizations during which he appealed for action against the Government of Turkey and the actions of the Azerbaijani Armed Forces, telling CNBC’s Hadley Gamble to “Imagine Caucasus becoming another Syria?” In another interview to the German Bild tabloid, he compared the situation in Stepanakert to German towns during World War II. After the ceasefire agreement was signed in early November, Sarkissian held a meeting with Karekin II, where they both made a call to declare 22 November as the Day of Remembrance of the Heroes who fell for the Defense of the Motherland in the Artsakh Liberation War. On 16 November, in an address to the nation, he concluded that snap parliamentary elections and Pashinyan's resignation were inevitable in light of the protests, proposing that a process be overseen and managed by an interim "National Accord Government". In early 2021, he called for the creation of a "Fourth Republic".

Official visits hosted by Sarkissian

Personal life 
He married Nouneh Sarkissian (born 1954), a researcher at the Matenadaran, in 1978. Together, they have two adult children. Besides Armenian and Russian, two languages that Sarkissian grew up speaking, he also is fluent in English as a results of his time spent in the United Kingdom. Until December 2011, Sarkissian held British citizenship. As of April 2019, Sarkissian has a net worth of over 3 million Euros (over 1,600,000,000 in Armenian Drams). He was a personal friend of Soviet intelligence officer Gevork Vartanian.

On 5 January 2021, the presidential office of Armenia announced that he underwent a leg surgery on 3 January in London, and that he tested positive for the COVID-19. He began his treatment in London and only returned to Yerevan on 20 February.

Awards 
Domestic
 Order of Merit for the Fatherland 1st degree - (15 September 2017)
 St. Gregory the Great Award (1997) - bestowed by Pope John Paul II.
 St. Gregory the Illuminator medal (2008) - the highest honour of the Armenian Apostolic Church - by Karekin II, Catholicos Patriarch of All Armenians of Holy Etchmiadzin.

Foreign
  Grand Cross with Collar of the Order of Merit of the Italian Republic (Italy, 2018)
 John Edwin Mroz Global Statesman Award (EastWest Institute, 2018)

Notes

References

External links 

 Biographical information
 Biography of Armen Sarkissian

|-

1952 births
Ambassadors of Armenia to the Holy See
Ambassadors of Armenia to the United Kingdom
Living people
Politicians from Yerevan
Presidents of Armenia
Prime Ministers of Armenia